Lochgair is a village in Argyll and Bute, Scotland.  It lies on the coast of Loch Gair, a small inlet on the west of Loch Fyne. The A83 road runs through the village.

In fiction
Lochgair is one of the main settings of Iain Banks's 1992 novel The Crow Road, which mixes real life locations in Argyll and the A83 road with fictional ones.

References
 

Villages in Argyll and Bute